RepTrak (formerly known as Reputation Institute) is a company that publishes reports on the reputation of corporations and places, based on consumer surveys and media coverage. It is headquartered in Boston, Massachusetts.

History 
In 1999, Charles Fombrun, a professor at New York University Stern School of Business, and Cees van Riel, a professor at Rotterdam School of Management, founded Reputation Institute.

In early 2020, the company changed its name to RepTrak.

In Early 2023 Mark Sonders became the CEO

Reputation ratings 
In collaboration with Harris Interactive, Reputation Institute developed Reputation Quotient (RQ) in 1999. In 2005, Reputation Institute developed the RepTrak model to replace RQ. As of 2016, RepTrak studies are conducted annually. RepTrak analyzes corporate reputation using measures in seven dimensions: "products and services," "innovation," "workplace," "governance," "citizenship," "leadership," and "performance." The company also publishes Country RepTrak which ranks the reputations of nations using three criteria: "appealing environment," "advanced economy," and "effective government."

References

External links 

1999 establishments in New York (state)
Companies based in Boston
Research institutes established in 1999
Research institutes in Massachusetts